This is a list of lists of Christian theologians organized by denomination, century, nationality, and additional specialized categories.

Lists of theologians by denomination 
 Eastern Orthodox theologians
 Old Catholic theologians
 Protestant theologians
 Roman Catholic theologians

Protestant Lists
 Protestant theologians by denomination
 Anabaptist theologians
 Canadian Anabaptist
 Mennonite
 Anglican theologians
 Baptist theologians
 Calvinist and Reformed theologians
 Lutheran theologians
 Methodist theologians
 Pentecostal theologians
 Quaker theologians
 Reformed Baptists
 Renewal theologian
 Seventh-day Adventist theologians

Lists of theologians by century
 Anglican theologians by century 
 Eastern Orthodox theologians by century
 Protestant theologians by century
 Roman Catholic theologians by century

All denominations
 1st-century Christian theologians
 2nd-century Christian theologians
 3rd-century Christian theologians
 4th-century Christian theologians
 5th-century Christian theologians
 6th-century Christian theologians
 7th-century Christian theologian
 8th-century Christian theologians
 9th-century Christian theologians
 10th-century Christian theologians
 11th-century Christian theologians
 12th-century Christian theologians
 13th-century Christian theologians
 14th-century Christian theologians
 15th-century Christian theologians
 16th-century Christian theologians
 17th-century Christian theologians
 18th-century Christian theologians
 19th-century Christian theologians
 20th-century Christian theologians
 21st-century Christian theologians

Anglican
 16th-century Anglican theologians
 17th-century Anglican theologians
 18th-century Anglican theologians
 19th-century Anglican theologians
 20th-century Anglican theologians
 21st-century Anglican theologians

Calvinist and Reformed
 16th-century Calvinist and Reformed theologians
 17th-century Calvinist and Reformed theologians
 18th-century Calvinist and Reformed theologians
 19th-century Calvinist and Reformed theologians
 20th-century Calvinist and Reformed theologians
 21st-century Calvinist and Reformed theologians

Eastern Orthodox
 12th-century Eastern Orthodox theologians
 13th-century Eastern Orthodox theologians
 14th-century Eastern Orthodox theologians
 15th-century Eastern Orthodox theologians
 16th-century Eastern Orthodox theologians
 17th-century Eastern Orthodox theologians
 18th-century Eastern Orthodox theologians
 19th-century Eastern Orthodox theologians
 20th-century Eastern Orthodox theologians
 21st-century Eastern Orthodox theologians

Protestant
 16th-century Protestant theologians
 17th-century Protestant theologians
 18th-century Protestant theologians
 19th-century Protestant theologians
 20th-century Protestant theologians
 21st-century Protestant theologians

Roman Catholic
 11th-century Roman Catholic theologians
 12th-century Roman Catholic theologians
 13th-century Roman Catholic theologians
 14th-century Roman Catholic theologians
 15th-century Roman Catholic theologians
 16th-century Roman Catholic theologians
 17th-century Roman Catholic theologians
 18th-century Roman Catholic theologians
 19th-century Roman Catholic theologians
 20th-century Roman Catholic theologians
 21st-century Roman Catholic theologians

Lists of theologians by nationality

By denomination
 Anglican theologians by nationality
 Baptist theologians by nationality
 Eastern Orthodox theologians by nationality
 Byzantine theologians
 Greek theologians
 Russian theologians
 Serbian theologians
 Old Catholic theologians by nationality
 German Old Catholic theologians
 Swiss Old Catholic theologians
 Protestant theologians by nationality
 Austrian Protestant theologians
 Dutch Protestant theologians
 French Protestant theologians
 German Protestant theologians
 Polish Protestant theologians
 Swiss Protestant theologians
 Canadian Protestant theologians
 Danish Protestant theologians
 Filipino Protestant theologians
 Roman Catholic theologians by nationality

By Nationality
 American Christian theologians
 Australian Christian theologians
 Austrian Christian theologians
 Belgian Christian theologians
 Brazilian Christian theologian
 British Christian theologians
 Byzantine theologians
 Canadian Christian theologians
 Dutch Christian theologians
 English Christian theologians
 Flemish Christian theologians
 French Christian theologians
 German Christian theologians
 Indian Christian theologians
 Irish Christian theologians
 Italian Christian theologians
 Namibian Christian theologians
 Peruvian Christian theologians
 Polish Christian theologians
 Scottish Christian theologians
 Spanish Christian theologians
 Swiss Christian theologians

Roman Catholic Lists
 Roman Catholic theologians by order
 Canonical Augustinian theologians
 Benedictine theologians
 Dominican theologians
 Franciscan theologians
 Jesuit theologians
 Dissident Roman Catholic theologians
 Doctors of the Church
 Roman Catholic moral theologians
 Scholastic philosophers
 List of Catholic philosophers and theologians
 Thomists

Other Lists
 Women Christian theologians
 Lay theologians
 Canonical theologians
 Christologists
 Ecclesiologists
 Church Fathers
 Christian feminist theologians
 Christian Hebraists
 Liturgists
 Christian socialist theologians
 Systematic theologians
 Christian universalist theologians
 Patristic scholars
 Death of God theologians
 Existentialist theologians
 Liberation theologians
 Political theologians
 Process theologians
 Public theologians

See also
 Biblical criticism
 Biblical hermeneutics
 Christian theology
 Textual criticism

 
Theologians, Lists of Christian
Christian theologians, Lists of